Barbara Orbison (January 10, 1950 – December 6, 2011) was a German-born United States-based entrepreneur, music producer and publisher, and the second wife of American musician Roy Orbison.

Biography
Barbara Anne Marie Wellhöner Jakobs was born in Bielefeld, Germany on January 10, 1950. Her mother was Friedel Hitz. Aged 18, she met the 32-year-old Orbison when her asked friends to introduce him to her at Batley Variety Club, West Yorkshire, England, during Orbison's UK tour. A few weeks later, two of Orbison's three sons died in a house fire. Barbara and Orbison married on March 25, 1969, in Hendersonville, Tennessee. They divided their time between Nashville, Tennessee and Malibu, California, bringing up their two sons, Roy Kelton Orbison, Jr. (born 1970) and Alexander Orbi Orbison (born 1975).

During the 1980s, she managed her husband's career and was the executive producer of his 1987 album, In Dreams: The Greatest Hits, plus his January 1988 televised music special, Roy Orbison and Friends: A Black and White Night. Following her husband's death on December 6, 1988, she took charge of his business affairs and dedicated herself to promoting his music to subsequent generations.

She worked with friend and fellow artist Jeff Lynne to assemble the posthumous release of the King of Hearts album in 1992 (an album which was re-issued in 2007 by Sony BMG after they took charge of Virgin's catalog in 2005) as well as other record projects. She co-produced Only the Lonely: The Roy Orbison Story, a European stage musical.

In late 1993, the family home in Malibu was destroyed by brush fires. Although she maintained a residence on the West Coast, she returned to Nashville where she purchased a home as well as a commercial property to house her music publishing business. Her company, Still Working Music employs songwriters such as Tommy Lee James and Chase Bryant.

Orbison was also involved with charitable causes in aid of the homeless. For Showtime, in 1990, she produced a Roy Orbison tribute at the Universal Amphitheatre in Los Angeles that raised in excess of $1 million for the city's homeless. She personally funded "Orbison House", a 21-unit residence for the mentally impaired homeless of Los Angeles.

She produced Damien Leith's album, Roy: A Tribute to Roy Orbison, which was released by Sony BMG in Australia on 15 April 2011 to coincide with Roy Orbison's 75th birthday.

Death
Orbison was hospitalized from May 2011 until her death from pancreatic cancer on December 6, 2011 (Roy Orbison also died on December 6, in 1988). She was buried next to her husband at Westwood Village Memorial Park Cemetery in Los Angeles. This was followed by a celebration of her life in Nashville, Tennessee.

References

External links
Still Working Music

Barbara Orbison interview at timesonline.co.uk
"Widow of singer Roy Orbison," Los Angeles Times obituary

1950 births
2011 deaths
American philanthropists
American women record producers
Burials at Westwood Village Memorial Park Cemetery
Deaths from cancer in California
Deaths from pancreatic cancer
German emigrants to the United States
People from Bielefeld
Record producers from California
Roy Orbison